Steven Sanders (born 2 June 1978 in Halifax) is an English former professional footballer who played in the Football League as a full-back for Doncaster Rovers. He began his career with Huddersfield Town, but never played in the league. After Doncaster he joined Lincoln City, but again never played league football, and then went on to play non-league football for Boreham Wood, Harrogate Town, Guiseley, Liversedge, Chelmsford City, Maidenhead United and Kingstonian.

Sanders is now working for Jones Lang LaSalle as a quantity surveyor after graduating from Leeds Metropolitan University.

References

External links
 

1978 births
Living people
Footballers from Halifax, West Yorkshire
English footballers
Association football fullbacks
Huddersfield Town A.F.C. players
Doncaster Rovers F.C. players
Lincoln City F.C. players
Boreham Wood F.C. players
Harrogate Town A.F.C. players
Guiseley A.F.C. players
Liversedge F.C. players
Chelmsford City F.C. players
Maidenhead United F.C. players
Kingstonian F.C. players
English Football League players
Alumni of Leeds Beckett University